The Old Voss Line is a heritage railway between Garnes and Midttun near Bergen, Norway.

Originally constructed as a  narrow gauge line, it formed part of the Bergen to Voss railway opened in 1883. Electrified in 1954, it continued to serve as part of the Bergen to Oslo main line until the Arnanipa Tunnel and the  Ulriken Tunnel, which opened in 1964, resulted in the closure of the line for passenger traffic. The line is still open for freight traffic.

The Midttun terminus is located near Nesttun, and there are further intermediate stops at Arna, Espeland and Haukeland. The service operates with a type 18 steam locomotive, no. 255, built in 1913, decommissioned in 1969 and restored by volunteers between 1981 and 1993. It pulls a series of teak coaches built between 1921 and 1938. The locomotive is stored in the engine shed at the restored Garnes station that features a museum, a coach shed, a yard and turntable.

References

External links
Old Voss Line web site
Norwegian Railway Association

Railway lines in Norway
Heritage railways in Norway
Transport in Bergen
Railway lines in Vestland
Railway lines opened in 1883
1883 establishments in Norway
Museums in Bergen
Tourist attractions in Vestland
Railway museums in Norway